Monroe Charter Township is a charter township of Monroe County in the U.S. state of Michigan.  As of the 2010 census, the township population was 14,568.

The township is bordered by the city of Monroe to the north, but the two are administered autonomously.  The township was organized in 1827 and named after James Monroe, the 5th President of the United States.

Communities
The community was first platted in 1921 by William Bolles, who began selling lots for year round residents.
Greening is a former settlement located within the township. A post office in Greening operated very briefly from March 3 to August 6, 1898. 
Monroe High School is located in West Monroe.

Geography

Major highways
 runs south–north along the eastern end of the township near Lake Erie.
 runs south–north through the center of the township.
 US 25 is a former U.S. highway from 1926–1973 that is now replaced with M-125.
 runs west through the township on the southside of the River Raisin.
 runs parallel east of US 24.

Demographics
As of the census of 2010, there were 14,568 people, 5,312 households, and 3,686 families residing in the township. The racial makeup of the township was 94.93% White, 1.87% African American, 0.19% Native American, 0.82% Asian, 0.01% Pacific Islander, 0.79% from other races, and 1.39% from two or more races. Hispanic or Latino of any race were 1.97% of the population.

There were 5,312 households, out of which 33.5% had children under the age of 18 living with them, 52.4% were married couples living together, 12.3% had a female householder with no husband present, and 30.6% were non-families. 26.7% of all households were made up of individuals, and 10.9% had someone living alone who was 65 years of age or older.  The average household size was 2.50 and the average family size was 3.02.

In the township the population was spread out, with 26.2% under the age of 18, 8.5% from 18 to 24, 29.5% from 25 to 44, 22.3% from 45 to 64, and 13.4% who were 65 years of age or older.  The median age was 36 years. For every 100 females, there were 93.1 males.  For every 100 females age 18 and over, there were 89.7 males.

The median income for a household in the township was $45,694, and the median income for a family was $52,517. Males had a median income of $44,949 versus $26,674 for females. The per capita income for the township was $23,276.  About 8.2% of families and 10.7% of the population were below the poverty line, including 14.1% of those under age 18 and 8.8% of those age 65 or over.

Education
Monroe Township is served by two separate public school districts.  The majority of the township is served by Monroe Public Schools, in which Monroe High School is located within the township.  A small western portion of the township is served by Ida Public Schools, which is centralized in Ida Township.

Monroe County Community College is located within the township.

References

Sources

Townships in Monroe County, Michigan
Charter townships in Michigan
Michigan populated places on Lake Erie
Populated places established in 1827
1827 establishments in Michigan Territory